FreeMan is the fifth album by Filipino rapper Francis Magalona, released in 1995 by BMG Records (Pilipinas) Inc, Musiko Records.  It was Magalona's first outing with the BMG label, having left his previous label, OctoArts International Inc., in 1994.  Its release firmly established Magalona's legitimacy in the Pinoy rock scene. Tracks like "Three Stars & A Sun", "Kabataan Para Sa Kinabukasan", "Suckin' on Helium/Kaleidoscope World" would become defining touch-points in Magalona's body of work. A track titled "Intellectual Property Rights" would sample a speech by then-president Fidel V. Ramos. Intellectual property rights was an issue that would continue to be an important and very personal advocacy for Magalona.

The iconic cover of the album featured an image of Magalona's son Elmo, aged six months.  A version of "Kabataan Para Sa Kinabukasan" became the advertising theme for the Royal Tru-Orange soda drink brand, since a previous FrancisM song, "Ito ang gusto ko!" had already been used to promote that product.  The song was also featured in Pare Ko, a popular movie from that time which featured music from up and coming Pinoy Rock artists.  "Kaleidoscope World" went on to win 1996 Awit Award for Best Produced Record of the Year, and the 1996 NU 107 Rock Award for Song of the Year.  "Kaleidoscope World"'s music video was directed by the celebrated director/cinematographer Raymond Red, and showed Magalona, his band Hardware Syndrome, his backup singers "the Evil Stepsisters", and the respective children of Magalona and Red at that time. In January 1996, release a new single "Pikon".

Throughout the rest of his career, Magalona would repeatedly refer to elements in FreeMan as a starting points for new endeavors.  The motif and title of "Three Stars and a Sun" would become the defining mark of his fashion label, FrancisM Clothing Company.  A later album, FreeMan 2, would repeat Freeman's themes with new music, and with the occasional retrospective examination of the influence of the first FreeMan album.  When Magalona died on March 6, 2009, "Kaleidoscope World" was played in many of the pay tributes to the artist, including an audio-visual has been paid  presentation from Eat Bulaga!, the noontime variety program of which Magalona was a co-host, and a short rendering of the song first at the Eraserheads' "Final Set" reunion concert 2009, which the band dedicated to Magalona.  The song was also played repeatedly during his wake and his burial.

Accolades

* denotes an unordered list

Track listing

Personnel 
Francis Magalona - Vocals

Hardware Syndrome Members:
Boyet Aquino - Drums & Percussions
Carlo Sison - Guitar
Francis Villanueva - Bass
DJ Kimozave - Turntable & Drum Machine

Additional Musicians:
Evil Stepsisters - Additional Vocals
Perfecto De Castro, Noel Mendez - Additional Guitars

Album Credits 

Executive Producer: Rudy Tee
A & R: Vic Valenciano
All Songs Are Mixed by Nikki Cunanan except "3 Stars & A Sun" and "Kabataan Para Sa Kinabukasan" Mixed By Jun Dela Paz; Contrapelo and Rasputin Lives Mixed by Herky Alonzo; Jolog By Rey Salac
Recorded & Mixed at Greenhills Sound Studios A,B,C & E
Photography By: Mitch "Super Mitch" Alvarado
Cover Concept: Francis Magalona
Art Direction: Mario Joson
Design And Execution: Chitty Ramirez

References 

1995 albums
Francis Magalona albums
Pinoy rock albums